Ilztal is a municipality in the district of Weiz in the Austrian state of Styria. The journalist Elfriede Hammerl was born  in the village in 1945.

Geography
Ilztal lies about 20 km east of Graz and 10 km southeast of Weiz.

References

Cities and towns in Weiz District